Euclidia limbosa is a moth of the family Erebidae. It is found in Senegal.

References

Moths described in 1852
Euclidia